The FIA WRC3 is a support championship of the World Rally Championship. The calendar consists of the same rallies and stages as the parent series and crews usually compete immediately after WRC2 entrants. Entry into WRC3 is limited to cars that are based on production models and homologated under Group Rally3 rules, although prior to 2022 Group Rally2 cars were used. There are championship titles awarded to drivers and co-drivers. The series began in 2013 and was limited to production-based cars homologated under the R1, R2 and R3 rules, until its cancellation at the end of 2018. The current format of the series began in 2020.

History
From 2013 the previous Production World Rally Championship was cancelled and replaced by WRC-3. With the introduction of Group R the new WRC-3 was contested by 2WD production based cars from R1, R2 and R3 classes. Teams and drivers competing in the series were free to contest any rallies forming the World Rally Championship. They had to nominate up to six events to score points in, and their best five results from these six events counted towards their final championship points score. From 2017 this was changed to nominating seven rounds of which their six best results counted. In 2018, FIA announced that the World Rally Championship-3 was being discontinued, with all WRC championships becoming four wheel drive with the exception of Junior WRC.

The 2019 season saw the running of two championships in support of the World Rally Championship using Group Rally2 cars. These were known as WRC 2 Pro for professional crews and manufacturer teams, and WRC 2 for privateers. However, this multi-class structure was found to be too confusing, with customer drivers in WRC 2 Pro whilst manufacturer teams were unofficially supporting WRC 2 entries. The categories were renamed again and the WRC3 name was revived in 2020. Professional crews would now contest WRC2 whilst privateers would contest the WRC3 where teams were not allowed to enter. Stricter rules on entry eligibility were introduced in 2021 clarifying the line between professional and privateer. 

In March 2021 the FIA announced that from the 2022 season WRC3 would be a Group Rally3 car based championship with Open and Junior category titles, also with championship titles for teams. These two categories were reduced to just one WRC3 title for Drivers and Co-Drivers in 2023 with no provision for teams. 

The 2022 FIA WRC3 Junior category consisted of Junior WRC, an arrive-and-drive style format competition organised by M-Sport. Crews born on or after 1 January 1993 registered for the championship and contested up to 5 rallies as set by M-Sport using Ford Fiesta Rally3 cars provided. This category was replaced by the restored FIA Junior WRC in 2023.

Rules 
In 2023, WRC3 entries can be made in the name of the driver or competitor. Other than the use of Rally3 cars, there are no restrictions on entry eligibility. Crews can compete in any rally on the WRC calendar but must nominate beforehand any rally that will count towards their WRC3 championship up to a maximum of 5 rounds, with the best 4 results contributing to the championship points tally.

Power Stage points also contributed during the 2021 season but were removed for the following season.

Results

Drivers' Championship

Co-Drivers' Championship

Teams' Championship

References

External links
  

Rally racing series

Recurring sporting events established in 2013